Hajjiabad (also Romanized as Ḩājjīābād and Hājiābād) is a city and capital of Hajjiabad County, Hormozgan Province, Iran. At the 2006 census, its population was 20,264, in 4,719 families.

Hajjiabad is located about 100 km north of Bandar Abbas (capital of Hormozgan Province) and is best known for its citrus products.

Referencesحاجی اباد شهر خرما 
پیاروم 

Populated places in Hajjiabad County
Cities in Hormozgan Province